Sebastian Schindzielorz (born 21 January 1979) is a former professional footballer who played as a defensive midfielder. Born in Poland, he represented Germany at U21 youth level and made one appearance for Germany B.

Club career 
After being relegated with 1. FC Köln in 2006, Schindzielorz joined Norwegian club Start on a free transfer and was Stig Inge Bjørnebye's first signing as head coach of Start. After playing five matches for Start, Schindzielorz joined the Greek club Levadiakos, before he joined VfL Wolfsburg in 2008. In the 2008–09-season, he played six league-matches when Wolfsburg won the league.

International career
In May 2002, Schindzielorz  was called up to the senior Germany squad for a match against Wales, however he remained on the bench and was ultimately never capped at that level.

Honours
 Bundesliga: 2008–09

References

External links
 
 
 

1979 births
Living people
People from Krapkowice
German people of Polish descent
Polish emigrants to Germany
Naturalized citizens of Germany
German footballers
Association football midfielders
Germany under-21 international footballers
Germany B international footballers
Bundesliga players
Eliteserien players
Super League Greece players
VfL Bochum players
VfL Bochum II players
1. FC Köln players
1. FC Köln II players
VfL Wolfsburg players
VfL Wolfsburg II players
IK Start players
Levadiakos F.C. players
German expatriate footballers
German expatriate sportspeople in Norway
Expatriate footballers in Norway
German expatriate sportspeople in Greece
Expatriate footballers in Greece